Peptides is a monthly peer-reviewed scientific journal covering the biochemistry, neurochemistry, pharmacology, and biological functions of peptides. It was established in 1980 and is published by Elsevier. The editor-in-chief is Karl-Heinz Herzig (University of Oulu).

Abstracting and indexing 
The journal is abstracted and indexed in:

According to the Journal Citation Reports, the journal has a 2020 impact factor of 3.75.

Notable articles 
According to Scopus, the following are the top three cited articles published in this journal:

References

External links 
 

Elsevier academic journals
Publications established in 1980
Monthly journals
English-language journals
Biochemistry journals